Hugh Montgomery, 2nd Viscount Montgomery of the Great Ards, (1597–1642) was an Irish aristocrat who supported the Royalist cause in the Wars of the Three Kingdoms.

Biography
Montgomery was born in 1597 son of Hugh Montgomery, 1st Viscount Montgomery of the Great Ards, Ireland, and Sara Maxwell, daughter of Sir John Maxwell, 4th Lord Herries of Terregles. Montgomery was a colonel in the Royalist army during the Irish Rebellion of 1641. He died on 15 November 1642.

Marriage and children
Montgomery married Jean, eldest daughter of William Alexander, 1st Earl of Stirling, Secretary of State for Scotland and Janet Erskine, (d. autumn 1670), who survived him and remarried to Major-General Robert Monro. By his wife he had four children: 
Hugh Montgomery, 1st Earl of Mount Alexander, eldest son and heir;
James Montgomery;
Henry Montgomery;
Elizabeth Montgomery.

References

Sources

1597 births
1642 deaths
Viscounts in the Peerage of Ireland